Vicki Escarra is an American business person and entrepreneur. She is the founder of Vicki Escarra LLC and serves as a senior advisor at Boston Consulting Group. Vicki is primarily known for her tenure as CMO of Delta Air Lines, CEO of Feeding America, and Global CEO of Opportunity International.

Career 
Vicki Escarra founded Vicki Escarra LLC, a consulting firm, in 2017. In 2017, Vicki joined the board of My Next Season. She also serves as Senior Advisor at Boston Consulting Group.

From 2012 to 2017, Vicki was the global CEO of Opportunity International, a global non-profit organization that helps people in developing nations work their way out of poverty. The organization provides loans, savings programs, insurance, training and other financial services to more than 5 million people in 23 countries across Africa, Asia, Latin America and Europe.

At Opportunity International Vicki led initiatives to create a long-term strategic plan, rebrand the organization, streamline operations and increase global fundraising by 30 percent in 2013, expanding the organization's work around the world. She also strengthened partnerships with corporate and institutional donors such as Caterpillar, MasterCard and John Deere as part of the organization's plan to create 20 million jobs by 2020.

From 2006 to 2012 Vicki served as the first President and CEO of Feeding America, a domestic hunger relief organization. As President and CEO, Vicki changed the name of the organization from America's Second Harvest to Feeding America, creating a visibility and awareness that went on to increase fundraising by 300 percent, nearly double its client base, and increase corporate contributions from $8 million to $33 million in about six years. "Vicki’s impact on the Feeding America network [was] phenomenal," said David Brearton, Feeding America board chair via a statement. "The board of directors is profoundly grateful to Vicki for her more than six years of dedicated service."

Prior to Feeding America, Vicki spent nearly 30 years at Delta Air Lines, holding titles including Executive Vice President and chief marketing officer of the 52,000-employee company.

Vicki is a member of the DocuSign Advisory Board, and The MAVEN Project Board. She previously held board positions with Centene, Health Net, and A. G. Edwards. She was the first and only female chairperson of the Atlanta Convention & Visitors Bureau and has been a member of the Economic Club of Chicago, the Committee of 200, and Roosevelt University Board of Regents.

Awards 
Vicki was awarded the Women Extraordinaire Award in 2016 by the International Women Associates, the Women of Influence Award in 2014 by the Chicago Business Journal, and the 2014 Pow! Award from Womenetics for her work to promote the role of women in society. She was also presented with the Committee of 200 (C200) Annual Luminary Award in 2014 presented by Accenture for her work in emphasizing the role that education and training play in helping people secure employment. In 2009, Vicki received a Four Freedoms Award from the Roosevelt Institute in the Freedom from the Want category, which honors people who embody Franklin Delano Roosevelt’s vision for democracy in their life and work. She was named among America's top 50 most powerful and influential executives by The NonProfit Times for three consecutive years, and in 2002 she was honored with the YWCA Women of Achievement Award.

Life 
Vicki Escarra was born in Atlanta, Georgia and grew up around Decatur, Georgia. She lives in Chicago and has two adult daughters, Emily and Kathryn.

Vicki obtained a Bachelors degree in Psychology and Business at Georgia State University and completed executive courses including the Executive Management Program at Columbia University and the Executive Leadership Program at Harvard University.

References 

American corporate directors
Year of birth missing (living people)
Living people
American women in business
21st-century American women